Telford Gardens (often referred to as "Telford Garden") is a private housing estate located above the MTR Kowloon Bay Depot and alongside Kowloon Bay station in Kowloon Bay, Kowloon, Hong Kong. It was jointly built by Hang Lung Properties and Hopewell Holdings, and Telford Plaza II was built by New World Development. Being the first property development project of the Mass Transit Railway, the estate is now managed by the corporation. The address of Telford Gardens is 33 Wai Yip Street, Kowloon Bay, Kowloon, Hong Kong.

The estate comprises a total of 41 residential blocks completed between 1980 and 1982, organised by alphabetical order (from A to U), with only Block L not sharing its lobby with a twin block. There are 4,992 flats in total. At first, many flats in Blocks R, S  and T were bought by the Hong Kong Government as houses for its firemen and policemen, as well as by airlines for their employees as the Estate is near the former Kai Tak Airport, closed 1998. Most of these properties are now back on the private market.



Nearby amenities and facilities 
Telford Plaza I, recently substantially renovated, is one of the largest shopping centres in Kowloon Bay. Telford Plaza II was a more recent addition to Telford Plaza I and their exits face each other. Telford Plaza I has 2 levels while Telford Plaza II has 4. The complex includes shops, banks, restaurants, a cinema, a department store, electronics chain stores, etc. The open-air area has banks, a kindergarten, a community centre, music and dance centres, Telford Annex of the Community College of City University, and clinics.

Previously, nearby there was also Wellington College (now part of City University), a police station, the Independent Commission Against Corruption offices (now moved), a skatepark, and other facilities.

The podium area has a park with a resting area, fountain, plaza and fish/turtle pond; the second level of the podium has a children's playground and is also the entrance area for many blocks. Telford Garden has a clubhouse, which has swimming pools, tennis courts, a fitness centre, etc. It was originally open to the public but is now members only as of 2006; fees are HK$10,000 to join and then HK$2,000 per year.

Telford Plaza is the main route between Telford Gardens, the Kowloon Bay MTR and the Kowloon Bay industrial area.  Thus, the air-conditioned pathways through the shopping mall are open 24 hours.

The  (港鐵總部大樓) at the far end of Telford Plaza II is the headquarters of MTR Corporation. There used to be a police station next to the pickup/drop off area but has since been moved. The minibus stop and taxi stands are right beneath Level 3 of Telford Plaza II and there are four carparks in Telford Garden, 2 for shoppers and 2 for residents.

The Kowloon Bay Depot is located under Telford Garden and is the largest depot in the entire MTR system. It houses trains serving on the Kwun Tong line and was also intended to be linked to East Kowloon line as there was no suitable space for a dedicated depot for that line. MTR Metro Cammell EMU trains and (prior to 2009) MTR Rotem EMU trains are stored and maintained here. In 2003 and 2004, some M-Train sets were refurbished at Kowloon Bay Depot for eventual service on the Disneyland Resort line.

Gallery

References

External links 

 

Kowloon Bay
Ngau Tau Kok
Private housing estates in Hong Kong
MTR Corporation
Hang Lung Group
Hopewell Holdings